The Lac de Gras kimberlite field is a group of Late Cretaceous to Eocene age diatremes in the Northwest Territories, Canada.

The Eocene (ca. 55-50 Ma) age diatremes of the Lac de Gras kimberlite field support two world-class diamond mines called Ekati and Diavik. Ekati, Canada's first diamond mine, has produced  of diamonds out of six open pits between 1998 and 2008, while Diavik to the southeast has produced  of diamonds since its foundation in 2003.

See also
List of volcanoes in Canada
Volcanism of Canada
Volcanism of Northern Canada

References

Diatremes of the Northwest Territories
Geology of the Northwest Territories
Cretaceous volcanoes
Paleocene volcanoes
Eocene volcanoes
Volcanic fields of Canada